Collin Martin (born November 9, 1994) is an American professional soccer player who plays as a midfielder for San Diego Loyal in the USL Championship. He has played for D.C. United and Minnesota United FC in Major League Soccer, and for Richmond Kickers and Hartford Athletic in the United Soccer League. He came out as gay in June 2018, making him at the time the only out man in any of the big five American sports leagues or any top-division professional men's national soccer leagues.

Club career

Youth and College
Born in Chevy Chase, Maryland, Martin joined the D.C. United Academy during the 2009–10 season as a 14-year-old in the under-16 category. In his second season with the u16s, Martin led the team in scoring with 13 goals while leading the side to finish top of its group in the U.S. Soccer Development Academy. Then, the next season, Martin was promoted to the under-18s where he led the team in scoring with 11 goals. He impressed the coaching staff enough that season to earn playing time with the D.C. United Reserves in MLS Reserve League action.

Martin then choose to attend Wake Forest University where he would play for the Wake Forest Demon Deacons soccer team for the 2012 season in which he scored one goal and registered six assists. At the end of the season, Martin earned All-ACC Freshman Team honors.

D.C. United
On July 10, 2013 it was announced that Martin had signed on as a homegrown player with D.C. United of Major League Soccer, thus becoming the team's sixth homegrown signing. After a short loan spell at the Richmond Kickers in the USL Pro, Martin made his debut for D.C. United on August 3, 2013 against the Montreal Impact in which he came on in the 76th minute for Nick DeLeon as United won the game 3–1. He finished the 2013 season with seven league appearances.

Richmond Kickers (loan)
On July 17, 2013 it was announced that D.C. United had sent Martin out on loan to their USL Pro affiliate, the Richmond Kickers. He made his one and only appearance for the Kickers on July 23 against the Vancouver Whitecaps Reserves in which he started and played 85 minutes as the Kickers won the match 2–1.

On September 13, 2014 he scored his first professional goal to open a 2–1 win over the Charleston Battery in the playoff quarter-finals.

Minnesota United
In January 2017, Martin was traded by D.C. to MLS expansion side Minnesota United FC in exchange for a fourth-round pick in the 2018 MLS SuperDraft. He made his debut on March 25 in a 5–2 loss at the New England Revolution, as a 63rd-minute substitute for Mohammed Saeid.

Martin played 12 matches in his first season in Minnesota, five as a starter. Having taken no part in the 2019 season, he was loaned in late April to USL Championship team Hartford Athletic.

In October 2019, at the end of Minnesota's season, Martin was one of five players released.

San Diego Loyal
In February 2020, Martin was signed by San Diego Loyal for its inaugural season. He made his debut on March 11 in a 2–1 win at Tacoma Defiance, assisting the opener by Francis Atuahene via a free kick, and scored his first goal on September 2 to open a 1–1 tie at Las Vegas Lights FC.

During a home match against Phoenix Rising FC on September 30, 2020, Martin was the target of a homophobic slur by Phoenix midfielder Junior Flemmings during first-half stoppage time. Flemmings called him a "batty boy", a homophobic slur in his native Jamaica. After he went to the referee to report the incident, Martin was shown a red card that was later rescinded after the referee admitted he was confused. After Phoenix manager Rick Schantz declined to apologize and remove Flemmings, San Diego walked off the field and forfeited the match in protest. A week earlier, the Loyal had forfeited a match against the LA Galaxy II after a racial slur was used against one of their players. Flemmings was banned for six games and fined an undisclosed amount.

On May 7, 2022 Martin came on as a half-time substitute at New Mexico United with his team winning. He was sent off for his second yellow card in the 79th minute, and the hosts scored for a 1–1 tie in added time.

International career
Martin has represented the United States at U-14, U-15, U-17, and U-20 levels.

Personal life 
Martin was raised in an observant Episcopalian family.

On June 29, 2018, Martin came out publicly as gay. He was reported at the time to be the only active male professional soccer player to be openly gay.

Martin transferred his credits from Wake Forest University to George Washington University after joining D.C. United. He attended part-time for four years, and online for a fifth from Minnesota, before graduating in 2019 with a degree in history.

Career statistics

References

External links

 
 
 

1994 births
Living people
American soccer players
Association football midfielders
Bethesda-Chevy Chase High School alumni
Columbian College of Arts and Sciences alumni
D.C. United players
Gay sportsmen
Hartford Athletic players
Homegrown Players (MLS)
American LGBT soccer players
LGBT people from Maryland
American LGBT sportspeople
Major League Soccer players
Minnesota United FC players
People from Chevy Chase, Maryland
Richmond Kickers players
San Diego Loyal SC players
Soccer players from Maryland
USL Championship players
United States men's under-20 international soccer players
Wake Forest Demon Deacons men's soccer players